The yellow-breasted satinbird (Loboparadisea sericea), formerly known as the yellow-breasted bird-of-paradise and also known as the silken satinbird, is a species of bird in the family Cnemophilidae. It is monotypic within the genus Loboparadisea.
It is found in the New Guinea highlands.
Its natural habitats are subtropical or tropical moist lowland forest and subtropical or tropical moist montane forest.
It is threatened by habitat loss.

References

yellow-breasted satinbird
yellow-breasted satinbird
Taxonomy articles created by Polbot